Shady Grove is an unincorporated community in Jefferson County, Tennessee, United States.

History
Before the settlement of the area by European colonists, it is reported that a Native American village was located on Zimmerman's Island on Douglas Lake near the community.

Geography
The community is serviced by Dandridge's ZIP code, 37725.

Economy
The community is home to several boat docks, marinas, and a lakefront resort hotel complex.

Infrastructure
Since 1963, the community, along with portions of Jefferson and Sevier counties, is served by the Shady Grove Utility District (SGUD). SGUD provides municipal water to its service area, and is headquartered in Shady Grove on SR 139 since 2001.

References

Unincorporated communities in Jefferson County, Tennessee
Unincorporated communities in Tennessee
Populated places inundated by the Tennessee Valley Authority